Cristina Marcano (born 1960), is a biographer of former Venezuelan President Hugo Chávez. Along with Alberto Barrera Tyszka, she authored Hugo Chávez Sin Uniforme: Una Historia Personal, which was published in 2005 by Random House Mondadori.

References

Living people
Venezuelan biographers
Works about Hugo Chávez
1960 births